The eighteenth season of Law & Order: Special Victims Unit debuted on Wednesday, September 21, 2016, on NBC and finished on Wednesday, May 24, 2017, with a two-hour season finale.

Rick Eid, who previously worked on Law & Order and Law & Order: Trial by Jury, became the executive producer and showrunner, following Warren Leight's departure from the series at the conclusion of the seventeenth season. Eid himself departed the series at the end of the eighteenth season and was replaced by Michael S. Chernuchin.

Production
Law & Order: Special Victims Unit was renewed for an eighteenth season on February 1, 2016, by NBC. It was announced in March 2015 that season seventeen would be showrunner/executive producer Warren Leight's last season on the show; he signed a three-year deal with Sony Pictures Television, his contract allowing him to work on SVU for one final season. On March 10, 2016, it was announced that Rick Eid would replace Leight as showrunner on this season.

The 400th episode of the series aired this season. "Motherly Love," directed by Mariska Hargitay, was filmed and billed as the 400th show. However, due to the shuffling of episodes during the season, the episode actually aired as the 399th episode. The 400th episode that was aired was the eleventh episode of the season, "Great Expectations," which aired on NBC on February 15, 2017 (after being moved from its initial air date of November 9, 2016, and a second air date of January 4, 2017).

At the end of production of the season, during upfronts SVU was renewed for a nineteenth season. Following the renewal announcement, it was revealed that show runner/executive producer Rick Eid had departed the show. He took over Chicago P.D. as showrunner/EP starting with its fifth season, replacing C.P.D. co-creator/EP Matt Olmstead. Michael Chernuchin, former showrunner and executive producer for Dick Wolf's Chicago Justice series, as well as a former executive producer and writer for many past incarnations of the Law & Order franchise, was selected as SVUs new showrunner.

Storylines and cast changes
It was announced at the end of the seventeenth season that recurring star Andy Karl (who portrayed Sergeant Mike Dodds) would be departing the cast due to his Broadway work. He was killed off on the season finale by corrupt corrections officer Gary Munson.

It was announced on July 22, 2016, that SVU would do a ripped from the headlines episode based on Netflix documentary Making a Murderer. Henry Thomas appeared alongside Kelli Williams in the episode about a convicted rapist who is exonerated after DNA is freshly tested. Ice-T's character, Fin Tutuola, originally arrested Thomas' character 16 years earlier and then begins investigating him again when he is linked to a deadly crime. Williams played Melanie, a rape victim who initially identified Thomas' character. On August 20, 2016, it was announced that the season premiere would pit ADA Rafael Barba (Raúl Esparza) against Lt. Olivia Benson (Mariska Hargitay) on opposing sides of the verdict. The episode "Rape Interrupted" (which guest stars Anthony Edwards), was ripped from the headlines based on the Brock Turner sexual assault case, where Turner sexually assaulted an unconscious girl and was later convicted of three felony sexual assault charges. Turner was leniently punished as he only served three months of his six-month sentence, though he originally faced 14 years in prison based on charges. Executive producer Julie Martin told The Huffington Post, "It is a phenomenon. Unfortunately, there have been several cases like that over the spring and the summer." Hargitay pondered if a similar case were to happen on the show: "Like if I was the detective on that case? It could be healing to somebody to see what should happen. [Seeing] justice," Hargitay continued, "If a judge would do a different sentence. You know, that's healing for people to see the right thing, the just thing happen."

Cast

Main cast

 Mariska Hargitay as Lieutenant Olivia Benson
 Kelli Giddish as Junior Detective Amanda Rollins
 Ice-T as Senior Detective Odafin "Fin" Tutuola
 Peter Scanavino as Junior Detective Dominick "Sonny" Carisi, Jr.
 Raúl Esparza as Assistant District Attorney Rafael Barba

Recurring cast

 Robert John Burke as Internal Affairs Bureau Captain Ed Tucker
 Peter Gallagher as Deputy Chief William Dodds
 Elizabeth Marvel as Defense Attorney Rita Calhoun
 Erica Camarano as Officer Rachel Ortiz
 Delaney Williams as Defense Attorney John Buchanan
 Callie Thorne as Defense Attorney Nikki Staines
 Lindsay Pulsipher as Kim Rollins
 Ami Brabson as Judge Karyn Blake 
 Jenna Stern as Judge Elana Barth
 Greg Germann as Derek Strauss
 Bill Irwin as Dr. Peter Lindstrom
 Jason Bowen as Detective Marcus Perry
 Stephen C. Bradbury as Judge Colin McNamara
 Bronwyn Reed as Lucy Huston
 Barbara Miluski as Judge Lisa Peck
 Steve Rosen as Defence Attorney Michael Guthrie

 Michael Kostroff as Attorney Evan Braun
 Tabitha Holbert as Assistant District Attorney Rose Callier
 Ami Brabson as Judge Karyn Blake 
 Sonia Manzano as Judge Gloria Pepitone 
 Betsy Aidem as Dr Sloane
 Max Baker as Colin Bennett
 Kirk Acevedo as Detective Ray Lopez 
 Meredith Holzman as Counselor Naomi Ziegler
 Vincent Curatola as Judge Al Burtuccio
 Helmar Augustus Cooper as Judge Reginald Flowers
 Yvonna Kopacz-Wright as Dr. Darby Wilder
 Mary Hodges as Judge Anita Wright
 Bjorn Thorstad as Defense Attorney Mitch Jackson
 Eric Elizaga as Dr. Stephen Hale
 Olga Merediz as Judge Roberta Martinez
 Michael Mastro as Judge Serani
 Lauren Noble as Carmen

Guest stars
On July 29, 2016, it was announced that then-Vice President Joe Biden would appear in the September 28 episode ("Making a Rapist") as himself to talk about the backlog of rape kits. Henry Thomas also appeared alongside Kelli Williams in the episode, Thomas portraying a convicted rapist who is exonerated after DNA is freshly retested.

On September 8, 2016, The Hollywood Reporter revealed that Anthony Edwards would guest star on SVU. Edwards starred on the NBC medical drama ER as Dr. Mark Greene; in season four of the medical series, Mariska Hargitay guest starred as Greene's love interest, Desk Clerk Cynthia Hooper. Later, TV Guide announced that Edwards would be portraying Benson's very first partner out of the Academy, Sgt. Patrick Griffin in "Rape Interrupted". Griffin's son is the suspect in a rape investigation that puts Benson at odds with ADA Barba and Griffin. Hollywood Reporter announced that rapper-actor Wyclef Jean was guest starring in the episode "Broken Rhymes" (originally titled "Bad Rap") as a famed music producer whose client is embroiled in an assault case. Mitchell Edwards portrayed Hype in the episode as well.

On October 11, 2016, Hollywood Reporter reported that Gary Cole would guest star as a politician whose campaign goes haywire when several women go public with damaging accusations. The character and the episode, titled "Unstoppable," drew comparisons to then-presidential candidate Donald Trump. The episode was originally scheduled to air on October 26, but was then delayed until November 16 after the election finished. The episode was pulled from the schedule a second time and is indefinitely shelved.

Episodes

Shelved episode
"Unstoppable", written by Julie Martin and Rick Eid, inspired by the sexual misconduct allegations against then-presidential candidate Donald Trump and starring Gary Cole, was originally scheduled to air on October 26, 2016, but it was pulled from the schedule and has since been shelved. At the 2017 Television Critics Association winter press tour, Dick Wolf expressed his belief that the episode might air that spring. NBC currently has no plans to air the episode, therefore shelving it indefinitely.

Reception

References

External links
 Official episode guide
 Season 18 episodes at IMDb.com

18
2016 American television seasons
2017 American television seasons